Indian Summer was an American emo and post-hardcore band originally from Oakland, California.

The band released a full 7-inch on Repercussion Records, and split 7 inches with Current, Embassy and Ordination of Aaron. They also released a song on the Eucalyptus compilation (2×7″) on Tree Records, a song on the Food Not Bombs compilation LP on Inchworm Records, and a song on the Ghost Dance compilation (2×7″) on Slave Cut Records. Science 1994 was released in 2002 and Hidden Arithmetic, an entirely live album consisting of one live set and a live radio broadcast, was released in 2006, both on the Future Recordings label. AllMusic described them as "one of the more exciting and influential bands in a crop of underground acts that defined an obscure but inspired era of American emo." Science 1994 has been named as the 37th best emo album by Rolling Stone.

A compilation of their entire studio discography titled Giving Birth to Thunder was released by The Numero Group in 2019. Pitchfork named the release a "Best New Reissue" in September 2019.

Discography
Most Indian Summer tracks remain commercially untitled, but fans have applied titles to them. Where multiple titles exist in common use, both are given, separated by a slash.

Indian Summer 7-inch (1993, Repercussion Records)
Current/Indian Summer split 7-inch with Current (1993, initial pressing on Homemade Records, reprint on Repercussion)
Embassy/Indian Summer split 7-inch with Embassy (1994, Slave Cut Records)
Speed Kills split 7-inch with Ordination of Aaron (1994, Inchworm Records)
 Science 1994 CD (2002, Future Recordings)
 Hidden Arithmetic CD (2006, Future Recordings)
 Hidden Arithmetic LP
 Giving Birth to Thunder LP (2019, The Numero Group)

Compilation recordings
 Eucalyptus double 7-inch (1995, Tree Records)
 Indian Summer - "Black/Touch the Wings of an Angel... Doesn't Mean You Can Fly"
 Current - "Bastille"
 Boilermaker - "Slingshot"
 Allure - "I Think I Can"
 Shroom Union - "Calm"
 Embassy - "Blackness"
 Julia - "I Will Not Be Ignored"

 A Food Not Bombs Benefit LP (1994, Inchworm)
 Ten Boy Summer - "The History of Blank Pages and the Conscious Decision To Discontinue the Tradition Our Gender Has Been Plagued With"
 Swing Kids - "Disease"
 Campaign - "Industry Slave"
 Indian Summer - "Reflections on Milkweed"
 Starkweather - "Mainline"
 Franklin - "Slow into Questionable"
 Finger Print - "Surrender"
 Braille - "Capitol"
 Half Man - "Tripped Up"
 Premonition - "Left Unsaid"
 Railhed - "End Song"
 Current - "Chairitied"

 Ghost Dance double 7-inch (1994, Slave Cut)
 Indian Summer - "Sugar Pill"
 From Ashes of - "Theme for Memory"
 Third Rail Rhyme - "Double Helix"
 Embassy - "His Years"
 Cap'n Jazz - "Blue Grass"
 Braid - "Elephant"
 Embassy - "How Can You"

Members 

 Adam Nanaa: Vocalist, Guitarist
 Dan Bradley: Drummer
 Eyad Kaileh: Drummer
 Marc Bianchi: Vocalist, Guitarist
 Seth Nanaa: Vocalist, Bassist

Source: Discogs

References

External links
 Interview with Marc Bianchi discussing Indian Summer

Emo musical groups from California
American post-hardcore musical groups
Musical groups established in 1993
Musical groups disestablished in 1994
Musical groups from Oakland, California